Cassiel Ato Baah Forson is a Ghanaian politician and member of the Seventh Parliament of the Fourth Republic of Ghana and a member of the Eighth Parliament of the Fourth Republic of Ghana representing the Ajumako-Enyan-Esiam Constituency in the Central Region on the ticket of the National Democratic Congress (NDC). In 2013 he served as the deputy minister for Finance.

He is currently the Minority Leader in Parliament of Ghana.

Early life and education 
Dr. Forson was born on 5 August 1978 and hails from Ajumako Bisease in the Central Region of Ghana. He obtained a PhD in Business and Management (finance option) in September 2020 from the Kwame Nkrumah University of Science and Technology (KNUST) in Ghana. Prior to getting the doctorate, the MP had two master's degrees: A master of Science in Taxation from the University of Oxford, UK and another Master of Science degree in economics from KNUST.
He had his first degree in accounting  at the South Bank University in London.

Dr. Forson is a member of the Institute of Chartered Accountants, Ghana and a fellow of Chartered Institute of Taxation.

Career 
Dr. Forson is a Ghanaian Legislator, Fiscal Economist, Chartered Accountant, Tax practitioner and Entrepreneur with professional experience spanning two decades in both private and public sectors. He was the managing director of Forson Contracts Limited in the United Kingdom. And he also served as the chief executive officer for Omega Africa Holding Limited.

Politics 
Dr. Forson is a member of the National Democratic Congress (NDC). He has been the NDC member of parliament representative for Ajumako-Enyan-Esiam constituency since 2009. He is currently the Minority Spokesperson on Finance.

2008 elections 
In 2008 he contested in the Ghanaian General Elections and won. He garnered 18, 593 votes which represents 51.66% of the total votes cast and hence defeated the other contestants including William Kow Arthur-Baiden, Alex Arthur, Rexford Mensah and Evans Addo-Nkum.

2012 elections 
Under the ticket of the National Democratic Congress again, he contested in the 2012 Ghanaian General Elections and won by obtaining 24,752 votes which represented 52.67% of the total votes cast.

2016 elections 
In 2016, he contested again in the 2016 Ghanaian General Elections and won again giving him the chance to represent his constituency for the third term. During the 2016 elections, he contested against Ransford Emmanuel Kwesi Nyarko, Jerry Henry Quansah, Sarah Mensah and Monica Daapong. He defeated them by obtaining 25,601 votes which represented 53.55% of the total votes cast.

2020 elections 
In the 2020 Ghanaian general elections, he again won the parliamentary seat with 39,229 votes making 58.1% of the total votes cast whiles the NPP parliamentary candidate Etuaful Rashid Kwesi had 28,229 votes making 41.8% of the total votes cast and the NDP parliamentary candidate Samuel Akombisa had 117 votes making 0.2% of the total votes cast.

Deputy Minister for Finance 
In 2009 he became a member of the Parliament of Ghana and served as the deputy minister for Finance in 2013. As deputy Minister he served as a member of Ghana's Economic Management Team. He has also served on several boards including that of the Bank of Ghana and Ghana Cocoa Board. He was also Ghana's Alternate Governor at the International Monetary Fund (IMF) and the World Bank.
His expertise were also brought to light when he chaired the Committee that implemented the Ghana Integrated Financial Management Information System Reforms (GIFMIS).

Committees 
Forson is a Ranking Member of the Finance Committee; a member of the House Committee; a member of the Foreign Affairs Committee and also a member of the Committee of Selection Committee.

Personal life 
Forson is a Christian. He is married with two children.

Controversy 
Forson was alleged to have caused financial loss to Ghana in a procurement of 200 ambulances between 2014 and 2016.

References 

Ghanaian MPs 2017–2021
National Democratic Congress (Ghana) politicians
Living people
Alumni of London South Bank University
People from Central Region (Ghana)
Ghanaian MPs 2009–2013
Ghanaian MPs 2013–2017
Ghanaian MPs 2021–2025
1978 births